The Noble Patron of Armor award is the top award given to supporters of the Army's mounted force by the United States Armor Association of the United States Army.

History
In 1986 the United States Armor Association began an awards program to honor the very best of America's tankers and troopers. The Noble Patron of Armor award program provides the mounted force with a way to recognize outstanding supporters of the Armor Force, while the Saint George Award recognizes members of the mounted force and the Order of St. Joan D'Arc Medallion is awarded to spouses selected to receive these honors.

Recipients

 Major General Richard “Dick” Chegar, AUS (ret.)
Don Stivers
Mary Preston
 CPT Joshua D. Bourdo
 Michael Shon McGuire
Texas State Representative Tony Dale
 SGT Trevor Hillard (Australian Army)
 MSGT Kevin B Warren, 108th Cav
 Mr. Lawrence Jaramillo OPS GRP
 SGT Keicelyn Pastores (U.S. Army)
 John P Dougherty (DoD Civilian)  
SSG Joshua C. Leppo

References

External links
United States Armor Association

Awards and decorations of the United States Army